The Manipur Legislative Assembly  is the unicameral legislature of the Indian state of Manipur.

Members of Legislative Assembly

See also
Vidhan Sabha
List of districts of Manipur
State governments of India
List of constituencies of the Manipur Legislative Assembly

References

Manipur Lok Sabha Election 2019 Results Website

  
Manipur MLAs 2017–2022